Ptolemy was one of the selected officers of Alexander the Great, called somatophylaces. He was killed at the siege of Halicarnassus, 334 BC, commanding two taxeis of Hypaspists, those of Adaeus and Timander.

References
Arrian, Anab. i. 22
Who's Who in the Age of Alexander the Great by Waldemar Heckel 

334 BC deaths
Somatophylakes
Ancient Macedonian generals
Ancient Greeks killed in battle
4th-century BC Macedonians
Year of birth unknown